Ixodia is a small genus of flowering plants in the family Asteraceae. It is endemic to Australia, ranging from South Australia to western Victoria.

Species list
The following species and subspecies are accepted by the Australian Plant Census as at January 2021:
 Ixodia achillaeoides R.Br. (S.A., Vic.)
 Ixodia achillaeoides R.Br. subsp. achillaeoides (S.A.)
 Ixodia achillaeoides subsp. arenicola (Schltdl.) Copley  (S.A., Vic.)
 Ixodia flindersica Copley (S.A.)

References

Gnaphalieae
Asteraceae genera
Asterales of Australia